Asagena brignolii is a species of cobweb spider in the family Theridiidae. It is found in Greece.

References

Theridiidae
Spiders described in 1996
Spiders of Europe